

Paul Raphael Montford (1 November 1868 – 15 January 1938) was an English-born sculptor, also active in Australia; winner of the gold medal of the Royal Society of British Sculptors in 1934.

Early life
Montford was born in Kentish Town, London, the son of Horace Montford, a sculptor, and his wife Sarah Elizabeth, née Lewis. Horace Montford won a gold medal at the Royal Academy Schools in 1869. Paul learned modelling from his father and later studied at the Royal Academy Schools and was considered a brilliant student. Montford won the gold medal and travelling scholarship for sculpture in 1891 and for many years after was a frequent exhibitor at the Royal Academy exhibitions. Among his larger works in Great Britain are: four groups on the Kelvin Way Bridge, Kelvingrove Park, Glasgow; groups for the City Hall, Cardiff; a statue of Sir Henry Campbell-Bannerman at Stirling; the statues of Alfred Beit and Julius Wernher at the entrance to the Royal School of Mines, London; and the two sculptures on Croydon Cenotaph. Montford married Marian Alice Dibdin (daughter of W. J. Dibdin) a capable oil-painter, on 11 September 1912.

Career in Australia

Sculpting commissions in England were scarce after World War I, so Montford decided to go to Australia in 1923 believing the light would be favourable to sculpture. He had difficulty in getting commissions and taught at the Gordon Technical College in Geelong, Victoria, and in July 1924 exhibited at the Geelong Art Gallery. When Charles Web Gilbert died in 1925, Montford was asked to complete the design for the memorial at Port Said; but there were difficulties in carrying out the work in Australia, and eventually it was given to Sir Bertram Mackennal in London. The winning of the competition for the sculpture for the Shrine of Remembrance at Melbourne gave Montford many years of work. He designed and modeled the four groups each 23 feet (7 m) high, and the two tympani each 56 feet (17 m) long and 8 feet (2.4 m) high in the centre. 

Montford was president of the Victorian Artists Society from 1930 to 1932. His generally good work as president was occasionally marred by a certain lack of tact. Some of Montford's best work about this period included the bronzes, "Water Nymph" and "Peter Pan", now in the Queen Victoria Gardens, Melbourne, and "The Court Favourite" in the Flagstaff Gardens, Melbourne. Other work includes relief portraits of eight Australian statesmen in the King's Hall, Parliament House, Canberra, and the war memorial for the Australian Club, Sydney. He was greatly encouraged and pleased on learning in 1934, that his statue of Adam Lindsay Gordon at Melbourne had been awarded the gold medal of the Royal British Society of Sculptors for the best piece of sculpture of the year. Another excellent piece of work is his vigorous statue of John Wesley in front of Wesley Church, Melbourne. His George Higinbotham near the treasury is less successful. Other examples of Montford's work are the memorials to Carlo Catani (St Kilda), William Benjamin Chaffey (Mildura), Sir Ross Macpherson Smith (Adelaide), Anne Daly, and "Pioneer Women" (Sydney). Montford is represented in the National Gallery of Victoria in Melbourne by "Atalanta", the "Spirit of Anzac", and two busts, and he is also represented in the Art Gallery of South Australia in Adelaide. He provided a model from which a portrait bust of Socrates was carved for the University of Western Australia by Victor Wager in 1932.
In 1937 Montford joined Robert Menzies' anti-modernist organisation, the Australian Academy of Art as a foundation member, but died before its first exhibition.

Legacy
Montford died after a short illness of leukemia on 15 January 1938 in Richmond, Victoria; he was survived by his wife and two daughters and a son. His ashes were scattered in the woods at Leatherhead, Surrey, England.

Montford refused to be influenced by the modernist school and was convinced it was a passing phase in art. The Greeks and the great Italians of the Renaissance appealed to him most. He was a sculptor of ability whose work showed good modelling, grace, careful arrangement, and vigour, as the occasion demanded.

References

External links

 

1868 births
1938 deaths
19th-century British sculptors
20th-century British sculptors
Alumni of the Royal Academy Schools
English male sculptors
Deaths from leukemia
Deaths from cancer in Victoria (Australia)
 
People from Kentish Town
Sculptors from London
English expatriates in Australia